Grandwood Park is a census-designated place (CDP) in Warren Township, Lake County, Illinois, United States. Per the 2020 census, the population was 5,297.

Geography
The community is in north-central Lake County, in the northwestern part of Warren Township. It is bordered to the north by the village of Old Mill Creek, to the west by Lindenhurst, and to the south and east by Gurnee. U.S. Route 45 runs along the west side of the CDP, leading south  to Mundelein and north  to Bristol, Wisconsin. Illinois Route 132 forms the southern boundary of the CDP; it leads east  to Gurnee and northwest  to Lindenhurst.

Grandwood Lake is a small impoundment on Mill Creek in the center of the community.

Demographics

2020 census

Note: the US Census treats Hispanic/Latino as an ethnic category. This table excludes Latinos from the racial categories and assigns them to a separate category. Hispanics/Latinos can be of any race.

2000 Census
As of the census of 2000, there were 4,521 people, 1,572 households, and 1,229 families residing in the CDP. The racial makeup of the CDP was 86.86% White, 4.14% African American, 0.11% Native American, 4.49% Asian, 2.10% from other races, and 2.30% from two or more races. Hispanic or Latino of any race were 5.57% of the population.

There were 1,572 households, out of which 46.1% had children under the age of 18 living with them, 67.0% were married couples living together, 8.5% had a female householder with no husband present, and 21.8% were non-families. 17.8% of all households were made up of individuals, and 2.2% had someone living alone who was 65 years of age or older. The average household size was 2.88 and the average family size was 3.31.

In the CDP, the population was spread out, with 32.3% under the age of 18, 5.8% from 18 to 24, 36.8% from 25 to 44, 20.1% from 45 to 64, and 5.0% who were 65 years of age or older. The median age was 34 years. For every 100 females, there were 97.1 males. For every 100 females age 18 and over, there were 92.0 males.

The median income for a household in the CDP was $71,674, and the median income for a family was $78,624. Males had a median income of $57,961 versus $34,471 for females. The per capita income for the CDP was $30,912. About 3.3% of families and 3.2% of the population were below the poverty line, including 4.9% of those under age 18 and 3.8% of those age 65 or over.

Grandwood Park is served by the Warren-Newport Public Library District.

References

Census-designated places in Illinois
Census-designated places in Lake County, Illinois